Benedictine Military School (also referred to as Benedictine or BC) is an American Roman Catholic military high school for boys located in Savannah, Georgia, United States. It was founded in 1902 by the Benedictine monks of Savannah Priory, which still operates the school, under the auspices of the Roman Catholic Diocese of Savannah.

History

Starting in 1874, Benedictine monks had gone to Georgia from St. Vincent Abbey in Latrobe, Pennsylvania, at the invitation of William Hickley Gross, C.Ss.R., at that time the Roman Catholic Bishop of Savannah. He was acting in response to a mandate given to all the Catholic bishops of the nation at the Second Plenary Council of Baltimore, held in 1866, to establish missions to the newly emancipated African American slaves. Two separate attempts were made to establish such a mission. By about 1900, both had failed.

Having decided to place themselves under the authority of Leo Haid, O.S.B., the Abbot Nullius of Belmont Abbey in North Carolina, ten monks established a monastery in the city at 31st and Habersham Streets, where they served Sacred Heart Parish. Recognizing the need for a Catholic boys' school, they established Benedictine College in 1902. In 1906, the groundbreaking ceremony was performed on the ground that would become the school's campus on Bull Street. In 1920, the school changed its name to Benedictine School because of the confusion that Benedictine was a college. However, the nickname "BC" stuck.

In 1963, the school moved to its current campus located on Seawright Drive on the south side of Savannah. Shortly after moving to the new location, the priory elected to return to the authority of St. Vincent Archabbey in Latrobe. Along with this change came the removal of the four year mandatory military program, with reduction to two years mandatory.

Academics

Benedictine's curriculum is College Preparatory. Advanced Placement classes are offered in Language, Literature, Calculus, Environmental Science, Human Geography, Biology, Government, American History, Economics and European History, in conjunction with a religious curriculum that caters to Catholic and Jewish demographics.

The JROTC program at Benedictine, with over 350 cadets, is one of the largest in the Sixth ROTC Brigade.

Organization 
Benedictine Military School organizes its military program based on an actual U.S. Army formation. Everyone in JROTC is part of the brigade, which is commanded by an outstanding senior student with the rank of cadet colonel, assisted by an executive officer (XO) who holds the rank of cadet lieutenant colonel. Below that the unit's organization continues to follow traditional army regulations: three battalions each commanded by a senior with the rank of cadet lieutenant colonel and an XO with the rank of cadet major; and nine companies total, three in each battalion, commanded by a cadet captain and a cadet first lieutenant as XO, including a headquarters company (1st Battalion) and a band company (2nd Battalion), organized very differently than the seven "regular" companies (3rd Battalion is the only unit to have three regular companies; the others each have only two). In the seven regular companies (lettered A through G) are two platoons each, commanded by a cadet first lieutenant. The lowest level of command is a squad, usually commanded by a junior with the rank of cadet sergeant first class; however, there are often a handful of squads led by some outstanding sophomores who hold the rank of cadet staff sergeant. Squad strengths vary but normally are around five or six, with at least two squads assigned to each platoon. Sometimes fire teams are organized, but they never operate independently of the squad, and their "leaders" (usually sophomores) have little real responsibility or authority.

Another special unit that is part of headquarters company is the brigade color guard, consisting of anywhere from six to twelve freshmen and sophomores, normally some of the top cadets commanded by a cadet staff sergeant. The brigade color guard is separate from the varsity color guard team and the drill team, which are considered quasi-sports teams that compete in multiple drill competitions in the spring, with the first competition always taking place at Benedictine (others are held throughout south Georgia). The brigade color guard takes part in numerous civic, military, and other public functions throughout the Savannah area during the school year, averaging several dozen. When the brigade is completely formed up in marching order (such as during the St. Patrick's Day Parade) the color guard marches just behind the brigade commander and his staff in the front, with two riflemen (carrying real rifles that have been de-militarized) on the ends "protecting" the flag bearers in the middle, flying the U.S., Georgia, and Irish flags (the Irish flag is only carried during the parade). During the parade battalion color guards are also temporarily formed, consisting of the two riflemen and a cadet carrying a JROTC flag. Each company also has a guidon bearer (a freshman or sophomore), who marches in front with the company commander.

The top ranks freshmen and sophomores may obtain are cadet corporal and cadet staff sergeant, respectively. The reason there are no cadet second lieutenants in the brigade is due to the fact that some JROTC units promote their juniors to officer rank, and it was decided long ago that no BC senior should be outranked by a junior from another school. Juniors hold all senior NCO ranks, ranging from cadet sergeant first class to cadet command sergeant major (CSM). All seniors are, of course, officers following the same rank structure as the regular army.

The brigade and each battalion also have a full staff, once again organized like the army. The brigade staff consists of an S-1 (personnel/administrative), S-3 (plans and operations), S-4 (supply), and S-5 (public affairs). Each brigade staff officer holds the rank of cadet lieutenant colonel, and each also has several assistants, including a junior serving as a sergeant major. There is also a brigade ordnance officer, a cadet major, who serves under the brigade S-4 (when marching he marches as part of HQ Company, not with the staff). Each battalion also has an S-1, S-3, and S-4 who are cadet captains and have an NCO with the rank of cadet master sergeant to assist. Unlike the army, the battalion staff officers are really under the control of the brigade staff instead of the battalion XO, which leaves the XO with little to do unless the CO is not present. There are also several other important NCO positions held by juniors – the brigade CSM, battalion CSM (3), company first sergeant (9), and platoon sergeants (who wear the stripes of a master sergeant). Normally, these positions lead to the corresponding positions senior year (though some are moved around to fill the XO positions, which have no equivalent NCO position).

The JROTC unit at Benedictine Military School has held the honor of being an Honor Unit with Distinction, which means that it is one of the top JROTC programs in the entire country. Benedictine has held the honor ever since it was created. It is decided by a variety of factors, including "points" accumulated throughout the year for participating in public events and also the Regional Formal Inspection (RFI) held in February, conducted by officers and NCOs from U.S. Army Cadet Command who grade a wide range of factors (including a uniform inspection of the entire brigade formed up at attention in Class A uniforms).

Staff/instructors 
The current senior army instructor (SAI), who is in charge of the JROTC program, is Lieutenant Colonel Stephen Suhr. The sophomore JROTC class is taught by Chief Warrant Officer 4 Don Schaefer, who served as a helicopter pilot in the Aviation Branch while in the army. Chief Schaefer holds the position of operations officer (basically S-3) and coach of the rifle team. Master Sergeant Reinaldo Osorio, who served as a medic and is the first instructor new cadets will experience as he teaches the freshman JROTC class. Sergeant Osorio is also in charge of personnel/administration (basically S-1), is the advisor to the brigade color guard, and serves as coach of the varsity color guard. In addition to the four full-time instructors, Mr. Cyril Durant, the music instructor, serves as the instructor for the band. All of the instructors are retired from the U.S. Army with nearly a century of service total, not including their years at BC. They also hold many high military awards and decorations both from America and foreign countries, including six Bronze Stars with Valor device (LTC Owens), Purple Heart (LTC Owens), Legion of Merit (MSG Osorio), Air Medal with Valor device (CW4 Schaefer), and Meritorious Service Medal. Also included is Master Sergeant Smith, who instructs the junior JROTC class (LTC LaRossa, CW4 Schaefer, MSG Smith, MSG Osorio).

Student life

Athletics
Up until 2004, BC had always competed in Georgia's highest classification. In 2004, the school dropped to AAA.  In 2008, to AA. In 2010, BC returned to Region 3-AAAAA. Currently, BC is in Region 3-AAAA of the GHSA.

Benedictine won state championships in soccer (2017, 2018), baseball (1961, 2014, 2018), golf (1983, 1985, 1993), and football (2014, 2016, 2021). During the 2009–2010 school year BC won eight region 2-AA championships.  The athletic program finished second in the Boys' Athletic Director's Cup Standings, which recognizes the best athletic programs in the state.  In the past eight years BC has finished no lower than 17th in the Cup standings, including four Top 10 finishes.  For a third consecutive year, BC earned the distinction of being the #1 athletic program in southeast Georgia as determined by the Georgia Athletic Director's Association.

The Benedictine football program ranks 23rd in all-time wins in the state of Georgia and has won 8 region titles.  Two Benedictine coaches have eclipsed the 200 win mark in Jim Walsh and Bob Herndon.  Benedictine football games have traditionally been played at Memorial Stadium since the 1960s, following decades of home games at Grayson Stadium in Daffin Park. From 2012-2017, all home football games have been played at Savannah State University's T.A. Wright Stadium, with all Home games since being played at Memorial Stadium. 

The Cadet football team has won four state championships, one in 2014, 2016, 2021, and one in 2022, all under coach Danny Britt.  They defeated Greater Atlanta Christian in the GHSA Class AA State Championship and win 45-21 claiming their first state title.

In 2016 the Cadets defeated Fitzgerald High School 49–26 in the 2016 GHSA Class AA State Championship avenging their 54–28 loss to Fitzgerald in the state quarterfinals the previous year.

In 2021 the Cadets defeated Carver High School 35-28 in the 2021 GHSA Class AAAA State Championship. The Cadets final 2021 record was 13-2 after starting the season 0-2.

In 2022 the Cadets defeated Cedartown High School 14-13 in the 2022 GHSA class AAAA STATE Championship. The Cadets final
Record was 13-2 after a 2-2 start. 

The Cadet soccer program won back to back state championships in 2017 and 2018.  In the 2017 matchup, they defeated Coosa by a score of 4–1.  In a repeat performance in 2018, the Cadets downed Putnam County by a score of 7–1.  Coaches Charlie Moore and Jack Turbiville were at the helm for both titles.

Student traditions

The Corps of Cadets has marched in every St. Patrick's Day parade in Savannah since 1903.

There has been a football rivalry with Savannah High School since the 1920s; a past tradition of many decades was the Thanksgiving Day contest between the two schools. However, they have not played since 2011 due to region alignments. The Cadets have begun a rivalry with Vidalia High School since joining Region 2 AA in 2012.

George K. Gannam, a 1938 Benedictine graduate, was killed during the attack on Pearl Harbor and was the first Savannah resident to die during World War II. The school holds a military review and formal ceremony on or around Pearl Harbor Day (December 7) each year to commemorate Staff Sergeant Gannam. The American Legion Post 184, named in his honor, presents the Gannam Award to the most outstanding sophomore cadet, and the God and Country Award to an outstanding senior cadet. The school presents the Gannam family an American flag which, in turn, the Gannam family gives back to the school to fly on the flagpole for the following year.

The Benedictine fight song is sung to the tune of the Washington and Lee Swing. Upperclassmen expect freshmen to correctly recite the fight song within the first days of a new school year. The song is sung by students, alumni, and friends at almost every athletic and school sponsored events.

Notable alumni

 John "Hook" Dillon (1941) - basketball player
 Ken "Hawk" Harrelson (1959) - former Major League Baseball player (1963–71) and former television broadcaster for the Chicago White Sox
 Mike Fitzgerald (1983) - former Major League Baseball player for the St. Louis Cardinals. Selected by the San Francisco Giants in the first round of the 1983 MLB January Draft-Regular Phase, before electing to attend Middle Georgia State College. Was again selected the first round of the 1984 MLB June Draft-Secondary Phase by the St. Louis Cardinals and signed with the team
 Josh Mallard (1997) -  former NFL defensive end (2002, 06–08)
 Stratton Leopold (1961) - film producer, director, actor & co-owner of Leopold's Ice Cream

See also
 National Catholic Educational Association

References

External links
 
 

1902 establishments in Georgia (U.S. state)
Benedictine secondary schools
Boys' schools in the United States
Catholic secondary schools in Georgia (U.S. state)
Educational institutions established in 1902
Junior Reserve Officers' Training Corps
Military high schools in the United States
Schools in Savannah, Georgia